Lost in the Pershing Point Hotel is a 2001 American comedy-drama film directed by Julia Jay Pierrepont III and starring Leslie Jordan.  It is based on Jordan's play of the same name.

Cast
Leslie Jordan as Storyteller
Erin Chandler as Miss Make Do
Mark Pellegrino as Tripper
Carlos Gomez as Nico
Lucas Elliot Eberl as Young Storyteller
John Ritter as Christian Therapist
Marilu Henner as Mother
Michelle Phillips as DeeDee Westbrook
Kathy Kinney as Red Neck Nurse
Arthur Hiller as Evangelist
Sheryl Lee Ralph as Nurse
Patrick O'Neal as Angry Bartender
Kris Kamm as Cotton Pine
Jesse Petrick as Johnny Striker
Adam Wylie as Duane Striker

Release
The film was released on December 7, 2001.

Reception
Dennis Harvey of Variety gave the film a negative review, writing that the film "emerges far more redolent of composite fiction cliches (...) than it does credible experience. The fault lies somewhat with execution that remains stubbornly theatrical..."

Kevin Thomas of the Los Angeles Times also gave the film a negative review and wrote that the film "could stand as a textbook example of how not to bring a play to the screen."

References

External links